Monticello is an unincorporated community in Van Wert County, in the U.S. state of Ohio.

History
Monticello had its start when the railroad was extended to that point. The community has the name of Monticello, the Virginia estate of Thomas Jefferson. A post office was established at Monticello in 1879, and remained in operation until 1909.

References

Unincorporated communities in Van Wert County, Ohio
Unincorporated communities in Ohio
1879 establishments in Ohio
Populated places established in 1879